Dona Ann McAdams (born 1954) is an American photographer.

Dona Ann McAdams’ work has been exhibited widely, nationally and internationally, at places such as the Museum of Modern Art; The Whitney Museum; The International Center of Photography; The Museum of Contemporary Art, Los Angeles; Robert Miller Gallery; and La Primavera Fotographica, Barcelona. Her photos are in the collections of, among other places, the Museum of Modern Art; The Metropolitan Museum of Art; The Print Club; and the Bibliothèque Nationale.

She has been recognized for her talents by grants from the Mid Atlantic Arts Foundation, the National Endowment for the Arts, the Polaroid Foundation, New York State Council on the Arts, and the Vermont Arts Council. In 2002 she received the Dorothea Lange-Paul Taylor Prize from the Center for Documentary Studies at Duke University.

Her work has appeared in numerous publications including The New York Times, The Washington Post, The Times of London, Artforum, Doubletake, and Aperture. Her monograph of performance work, Caught in the Act, was published by Aperture in 1996. Her other book, The Woodcutter's Christmas, a collaboration with Brad Kessler was published in 2001 by Council Oak Books.  The Garden of Eden, about people living with schizophrenia, was published by the Robert B. Menschel Photography Gallery at Syracuse University in 1997. Some Women, the catalogue for a 35-year survey of her work, was published by the Opalka Gallery of The Sage Colleges in 2009. The National Museum of Racing and Hall of Fame published an exhibition catalogue in 2011, A View from the Backstretch, in conjunction with an exhibition of her photography workshops with backstretch workers at the Saratoga Racetrack. Brattleboro Museum & Art Center published Dona Ann McAdams: Performative Acts in conjunction with a retrospective exhibition that toured to five Vermont venues, 2019-2021.

Her photography has also been included in numerous group exhibitions, including the recent Whose Streets? Our Streets! (2017) and Art After Stonewall (2019). McAdams's work features prominently in José Esteban Muñoz's Disidentifications (1999), and is also included in such recent books as Tim Miller's The Body in the O (2019), Matthew Riemer & Leighton Brown's We Are Everywhere (2019), and Sarah Schulman's Let the Record Show (2021).

McAdams was the house photographer for P.S. 122 for 23 years and received both Obie and Bessie Awards for her performance work. Her other work, documentary in nature, ranges widely and includes eclectic subjects such as: thoroughbred horse racing, Appalachia farmers, a community of schizophrenics living on Coney Island, and cloistered nuns. Some of her most memorable images are photographs from the street, where she uses the same techniques she does in live performance to create a kind of performance of everyday life. Her work has been compared to Henri Cartier-Bresson, Dorothea Lange, and Tina Modotti.

She has taught and lectured at, among other places, Rutgers University, New York University, The International Center for Photography, The American Center in Barcelona, Spain, and Hostos Community College, New York City.

In 2009, Maurice Sendak enlisted the help of his long-time assistant, Lynn Caponera, as well as photographer and community activist Dona Ann McAdams to help realize his vision of a residency for illustrators and in 2010 The Sendak Fellowship was founded. Though Sendak was only able to greet and mentor two groups of Fellows before his passing, his legacy was carried on each year. Dona Ann McAdams was it’s director until 2017. The goal of The Sendak Fellowship, in Maurice’s words, is for the Fellows to “ . . . create work that is not vapid or stupid, but original; work that excites and incites. Illustration is like dance; it should move like—and to—music." In 2018, the Sendak Fellowship received an Angel award from the Eric Carle Museum of Picture Book Art for fostering young illustrators and writers and providing them with incredible creative opportunities.  

McAdams has collaborated with and is married to Brad Kessler, American author of Lick Creek, Birds in Fall, Goat Song, and North.

She and Kessler live on a goat farm in Vermont.

Books
 Caught in the Act (Aperture 1996) 
 The Woodcutter's Christmas (Council Oak Books 2001)

Exhibition catalogues
 The Garden of Eden (Robert B. Menschel Photography Gallery 1997)
 Some Women (Opalka Gallery 2009) 
A View from the Backstretch (National Museum of Racing and Hall of Fame 2011)
Dona Ann McAdams: Performative Acts (Brattleboro Museum & Art Center, 2019)

References
Street Shots by Paul H-O on artnet (review/essay with images)
To Know Someone by Jacqueline Keren in Metroland
Get Visual David Brickman review of Some Women
Nippertown Tim Cahill review of Some Women
C-Monster interview
The Garden of Eden: Living with Schizophrenia on Coney Island, Dorothea Lange-Paul Taylor Prize (includes Kessler essay and images)
The Performance of Self in Everyday Life, NYPL for the Performing Arts
Light Work Permanent Collection (includes image and 2 essays)
Light Work Past Exhibitions
Creative Time Archive
Publications 1983-2004

American photographers
1954 births
Living people
American women photographers
21st-century American women